HMS Cobham was one of 93 ships of the  of inshore minesweepers.

Their names were all chosen from villages ending in -ham. The minesweeper was named after Cobham in Kent.

References

 

Ham-class minesweepers
Royal Navy ship names
1953 ships